Three ships of the United States Navy have been named Cumberland, after the Cumberland River.

 was a 50-gun sailing frigate launched in 1842 and sunk by CSS Virginia in 1862.
 was a steel-hulled sailing bark launched 17 August 1904 and disposed of in 1947.
 was a fleet oiler launched in 1944 and scrapped in 1972.

See also
 (1944)

Sources

United States Navy ship names